Achim von Borries (born 13 November 1968) is a German screenwriter and film director.

Selected filmography

References

External links
 

1968 births
Living people
Mass media people from Munich